Waterford is a census-designated place in central Waterford Township, Washington County, Ohio, United States.  It has a post office with the ZIP code 45786.  It is located on State Route 339 across the Muskingum River from the village of Beverly, slightly below where Wolf Creek meets the Muskingum. The community is home to both schools of the Wolf Creek School System. Waterford Elementary serves grades K through Eighth. Waterford High School serves 9–12th grades.

History
Waterford was established under the name of Millburg by the Ohio Company in spring, 1789. A post office called Waterford has been in operation since 1811. The name may be derived from Waterford, Massachusetts.

Notable people
 Julia Louisa Dumont (1794-1857), educator and writer
 Stephen Powers (1840-1904), writer and ethnographer, author of Indian Tribes of California
 Wilbur Cooper (February 24, 1892 – August 7, 1973)

References

Unincorporated communities in Washington County, Ohio
Unincorporated communities in Ohio